The 39th People's Choice Awards ceremony, honoring the best in popular culture for 2012, was held January 9, 2013 at the Nokia Theatre in Los Angeles, and was broadcast live on CBS and simulcast over Xbox Live at 9:00 pm EST. The ceremony was hosted by Kaley Cuoco. The nominees were announced in November 2012.

Katy Perry dominated the 39th People's Choice Awards by winning the most awards for one person, winning four nominations, including Favorite Female Artist. The Hunger Games was the top victor with five trophies while Twilight won Best Movie Fan Following.

Performances
Alicia Keys – "New Day" / "Girl on Fire"
Jason Aldean – "My Kinda Party"
Christina Aguilera – "Blank Page"

Presenters

Nominees
Winners are listed in bold.

Movies

Television

Music

Special Achievement Awards

References

People's Choice Awards
2012 awards in the United States
2013 in American television
2013 in Los Angeles
January 2013 events in the United States